Melaenae or Melainai was an ancient town on the island of Thera. It is mentioned in ancient inscriptions.

Its site is unlocated.

References

Populated places in the ancient Aegean islands
Former populated places in Greece
Ancient Thera
Lost ancient cities and towns